Apamea aquila is a species of moth belonging to the family Noctuidae.

It is native to Europe and Japan.

References

Noctuidae
Moths of Asia
Moths of Europe
Moths described in 1837
Taxa named by Hugues-Fleury Donzel